Jacob T. Robinson (March 27, 1920 - April 5, 2013) was a professional baseball third baseman in the Negro leagues. He played with the Chicago American Giants in 1947.

References

External links
 and Seamheads

Chicago American Giants players
1920 births
2013 deaths
Baseball third basemen
Baseball players from Arkansas
20th-century African-American sportspeople
21st-century African-American people